Dolpa District, is a district, located in Karnali Province of Nepal, It is one of the seventy-seven districts of Nepal and one of ten district of Karnali. Dolpa is the largest district (by area) of Nepal.

Geography and climate
Dolpa is the largest district of Nepal covering 5.36% of the total landmass of the country, located at 28°43’N to 29°43’N latitude, and 82°23’E to 83°41’E longitude. The district borders Tibet on the north and northeast, Jumla and Mugu districts on the west, Myagdi, Jajarkot, Western and Eastern Rukum on the south, and Mustang on the east.

A large portion of the district is protected by Shey Phoksundo National Park. The name is derived from the 12th century Shey Monastery and the deepest lake in Nepal, the Phoksundo Lake, both of which lie in the district. The park protects endangered animals like the snow leopard, musk deer and the Tibetan wolf. Shey Phoksundo is the largest and the only trans-Himalayan National Park in Nepal. It is the biggest area occupying district of Nepal.

Kanjiroba, Mukot and Putha Hiunchuli are other renowned peaks.

Physiographical the smaller ranges of the Great Himalayas comprise the southern border of the district. Between these and the border mountain ranges of Gautam Himal and Kanti Himal to the north, Dolpa district is a labyrinth of often wide glacial valleys and ridges. Kanjiroba Himal and Kagmara Lekh running northwest to southeast separate the valleys of the Jagdula in the west from the rest of the district.

Demographics
At the time of the 2011 Nepal census, Dolpa District had a population of 36,700. Of these, 70.1% spoke Nepali, 6.7% Gurung, 6.0% Sherpa, 5.2% Magar, 4.5% Tibetan/Dolpali, 3.9% Bote, 2.7% Kham, 0.3% Tamang, 0.1% Sign language and 0.3% other languages as their first language.

In terms of ethnicity/caste, 45.0% were Chhetri, 12.6% Magar, 11.2% Dolpo, 9.1% Kami, 7.1% Gurung, 6.4% Thakuri, 2.8% Sarki, 1.6% Damai/Dholi, 1.5% Hill Brahmin, 1.2% Tamang, 0.7% Bhote, 0.2% Newar, 0.2% Sanyasi/Dasnami, 0.1% Tharu and 0.3% others.

In terms of religion, 70.1% were Hindu, 29.4% Buddhist and 0.4% Christian.

In terms of literacy, 53.3% could read and write, 3.6% could only read and 43.0% could neither read nor write.

Dolpa's major occupations are agriculture (79.5%) and service (2%).

Tourism
Dolpa region is a distant region of Nepal and the central point of this area is Shey Phoksundo National Park. The east and south of Dolpa are surrounded by the Dhaulagiri and Churen Himal ranges and to the west is the Jumla district. Trekking to Lower Dolpa offers you the remarkable and breathtaking experience of a lifetime. The notable features seen here are snowy peaks, ancient and remote villages, rich wildlife, lovely Buddhist monasteries and wonderful lakes. The people of this area are simple and warm-hearted with an enthralling culture and traditions. The cultural traditions of this area are basically linked with the Tibetan culture.

Trekking into Dolpa presents an exposure to the high and remote Himalayan valleys, resembling the Tibetan highlands. The main highlight of Dolpa trekking includes “Shey Phoksundo National Park” which is one of the major national parks of Nepal. “Shey Phoksundo Lake” is another famous feature of this region. The lake is totally free of aquatic life, which the crystal waters clearly demonstrate. Surrounded by rocks, forests, and snow-capped peaks, the area has been described as one of the world's “Natural Hidden Wonders”.

Transport
This district, despite being the largest in area in the nation, has only 1 vehicle as of November 2012, and no road links to other districts. Government is trying to link roadway to Dolpa, Dunai. The road is linked to Rukum, Jajarkot districts.

Administration
The district consists of 8 Municipalities, out of which two are urban municipalities and six are rural municipalities. These are as follows:
 Thuli Bheri Municipality
 Tripurasundari Municipality
 Dolpo Buddha Rural Municipality
 She Phoksundo Rural Municipality
 Jagadulla Rural Municipality
 Mudkechula Rural Municipality
 Kaike Rural Municipality
 Chharka Tangsong Rural Municipality

Former village development committees 
Prior to the restructuring of the district, Dolpa District consisted of the following municipalities and village development committees:

 Bhijer
 Chharka
 Dho
 Jufal
 Kaigaun
 Kalika
 Lhan
 Lawan
 Likhu
 Majhphal
 Mukot
 Narku
 Pahada
 Phoksundo
 Raha
 Rimi
 Sahartara
 Saldang
 Sarmie
 Shun
 Tinje
 Tripurakot

See also
Dolpo
List of highest towns by country
Photo of Dolpa at http://www.bibekshresth.com.np/2020/08/dazzling-dolpa.html

References

External links

 Dolpa trekking maps

 
Districts of Nepal established in 1962
Districts of Karnali Province